Potter (also Old Potter, Rust)  is an unincorporated community in Polk County, Arkansas, United States.

Notes

Unincorporated communities in Polk County, Arkansas
Unincorporated communities in Arkansas